Joseph Fortune (born 1979) is an Irish hurling manager and former player, who is the current manager of the Westmeath senior hurling team. He is a former player with various club sides in Wexford and Dublin.

Playing career

Fortune's club career began at juvenile and underage levels with the Rapparees club in Enniscorthy. He later transferred to rival club Shamrocks before spending over a decade lining out with the Naomh Mearnóg club in Dublin.

Management career

Fortune's first move into team management and coaching came with a number of Dublin underage development squads in 2003 and 2004. He eventually became manager of the Dublin minor hurling team and guided them to Leinster Minor Championship success in 2007. Fortune subsequently took charge of the Dublin Institute of Technology team in the Fitzgibbon Cup before winning a Leinster Under-21 Championship title with the Dublin under-21 team in 2016. A spell with the Ballyboden St Enda's club team followed before a return to the inter-county scene with the Wexford under-20 hurling team. Fortune was appointed manager of the Westmeath senior hurling team in September 2021.

Managerial honours

Ballyboden St Enda's
Dublin Senior Hurling Championship: 2018

Dublin
Leinster Under-21 Hurling Championship: 2016
Leinster Minor Hurling Championship: 2007

References

1979 births
Living people
Hurling managers
Hurling selectors
Irish schoolteachers
Rapparees hurlers